Senator Hotchkiss may refer to:

James M. Hotchkiss (1812–1877), Vermont State Senate
Robert H. Hotchkiss (1818–1878), Wisconsin State Senate